The Imparja Cup and National Indigenous Cricket Championships are Australian cricket tournaments based in Alice Springs, Northern Territory. The tournaments are contested annually by teams of Indigenous Australian cricketers.

History
The Imparja Cup tournament has its origins in an annual match started in 1994 between Alice Springs and Tennant Creek by Shane and Mervyn Franey from Alice Springs and Ross Williams from Tennant Creek. By 1998 Northern Territory Cricket had become involved in organising the tournament and in 2001 Cricket Australia turned the tournament into a national competition. Imparja Television have been involved in the annual match and the national tournament since 1994. In 2016, Cricket Australia re-formatted the State and Territory Division to become the National Indigenous Cricket Championships, to set the pathway for aspiring indigenous cricketers looking to play first-class cricket. Also, an Indoor Cricket division was introduced into the Imparja Cup in 2016 as to allow more playing opportunities for Community sides.

Format
In its current format there are six divisions in the Imparja Cup and National Indigenous Cricket Championships together. The NICC Men's Division is played as a One Day and Twenty20 round-robin tournament with the two top teams playing off in a One Day limited overs final.

The NICC Women's Division is played as a Twenty20 round-robin tournament with the top two teams playing off in a Twenty20 final.

Teams in the Major Centres Division play Twenty20 cricket whilst the Community Men's Division and Community Women's Division both play a shorter, 14-over format in Super 8s.

The Indoor Cricket format sees teams play a fast-paced 6-a-side format.

Media
Since 2009, the tournament has been covered on National Indigenous Television.

You may also view the Northern Territory Cricket YouTube channel to view footage from the Imparja Cup.

Winners

References

External links 
 National Indigenous Cricket Championships at Cricket Australia YouTube channel

Australian domestic cricket competitions
Cricket in the Northern Territory
Indigenous Australian sport
Sport in Alice Springs
1994 establishments in Australia